UniSoft Corporation is an American software developer established in 1981, originally focused on the development of Unix ports for various computer architectures. Based in Millbrae, California, it now builds standardization and conformance testing applications for the digital television market.

History 
UniSoft was founded on October 5, 1981, in Emeryville, California. Their original business was Unix development, and they were soon recognized as one of the early implementers of Unix for the emerging 16-bit microcomputer market. By 1989, they had completed over 225 Unix implementations on various hardware platforms, which was estimated to have been about 65% of all such ports. UniSoft's port of Version 7 Unix was the first operating system for Sun Microsystems' Sun-1 workstations and servers. It also developed Apple Inc.'s Unix variant, A/UX, for the Apple Macintosh II. UniSoft UniPlus System V served as the basis of Silicon Graphics' GL2 operating system, which eventually evolved into IRIX.

In 1991, the company moved to its current offices in Millbrae, California. UniSoft shifted its focus to the television industry in 1997, in order to address standards compliant software in that market. It now works solely in development, testing, and broadcast tools for digital television.

See also 
 Callan Data Systems

References

External links 
 

1981 establishments in California
A/UX
American companies established in 1981
Unix history
Defunct software companies of the United States